Metters is a surname. Notable people with the surname include:

 Alfred Metters (c. 1863–1918), Australian Baptist minister and chaplain during WWI
 Chris Metters (born 1990), English professional cricketer
 Colin Metters, English conductor, orchestral trainer and conducting pedagogue
 Frederick Metters (1858–1937), Australian ironworker and businessman

See also
 Metters Building, building in Sydney
 Metters Limited, Australian manufacturing business founded by Frederick Metters